Hasted is a surname. Notable people with the surname include:

Edward Hasted (1732–1812), English antiquarian
John Hasted (1921–2002), British physicist and folk musician
Michael Hasted (born 1945), British artist, photographer, writer and theatre director
Sarah Hasted, American curator

See also
Haste (disambiguation)